Martigny-les-Gerbonvaux is a commune in the Vosges department in Grand Est in northeastern France.

History
During the Gallo-Roman period, Martigny was already on a known transit route, positioned between Metz and Langres.

See also
Communes of the Vosges department

References

Communes of Vosges (department)